Lungile Khumalo professionally known as Naima Kay, is a South African Afro-Jazz singer.

Career 
Lungile started singing and writing songs in her school choir, and also performed at a local jazz festival.

Her debut album, Umsebenzi, was released in South Africa in 2013. Lungile won a South African Music Award (SAMA) in 2014 for Best Newcomer.

The president of Touch Africa Records, Mdu Ngcobo,  gave her an Arabic name Naima Kay meaning "peace and tranquility".

Naima Kay receives consistent radio play with live appearances at national events like the Ugu Jazz Festival and the Durban Jazz festival.

Discography
 Umsebenzi (2013)

Awards 

In 2014, Naima Kay won the "Best Newcomer" award at the South African Music Awards with her first album "Umsebenzi".

References

1991 births
Living people
People from Port Shepstone
21st-century South African women singers